The Warren Wilson House is a historic home and farm complex located at Cape Vincent in Jefferson County, New York.  The limestone farmhouse is a -story structure with a three-bay, gabled main block and a 1-story gabled side-frame wing built about 1837.  Also on the property are a barn and three sheds.

It was listed on the National Register of Historic Places in 1985.

References

Houses on the National Register of Historic Places in New York (state)
Houses completed in 1837
Houses in Jefferson County, New York
National Register of Historic Places in Jefferson County, New York